Herpetogramma pertextalis, the bold-feathered grass moth, is a species of moth of the family Crambidae. It was first described by Julius Lederer in 1863 and is found in North America.

The wingspan is about 33 mm.

References

Herpetogramma
Moths of North America
Moths described in 1863